Zhupanovsky is a volcanic massif located in the southeastern part of the Kamchatka Peninsula, Russia. It consists of four overlapping stratovolcanoes. After 54 years of inactivity, the volcano began erupting on 23 October 2013 and again in 2014, continuing nonstop into 2016.

See also
 List of volcanoes in Russia
 List of ultras of Northeast Asia

References

Other sources

 

Volcanoes of the Kamchatka Peninsula
Active volcanoes
Complex volcanoes
Stratovolcanoes of Russia
Mountains of the Kamchatka Peninsula
Holocene stratovolcanoes
Holocene Asia
Pleistocene stratovolcanoes